Spirit Walker may refer to:

Spiritwalker (Native), an individual who is believed to have the ability to consciously leave his physical body and move in spirit form

Media
Spirit Walker (novel), a fantasy novel by Michelle Paver
"Spirit Walker", a song by Ween from the album La Cucaracha
"Spiritwalker", a song by The Cult
Spiritwalker, a series of nonfiction books by Hank Wesselman
Spiritwalker, a series of fantasy novels by Kate Elliott

 Spiritwalker (film), a 2021 South Korean mystery-action fantasy film